The Junior Naval and Military Club was a short-lived London gentlemen's club, which existed between 1870 and 1879.

It was a proprietary club founded by one Captain John Elliott, in response to the heavy over-subscription of existing clubs for servicemen, such as the Naval and Military Club and the Army and Navy Club. The club opened its doors in August 1870, in temporary premises at 19 Dover Street, and by June of the following year, it already had some 270 members, and its patrons and honorary members included the Prince of Wales, Prince Alfred, Duke of Edinburgh, the French Emperor Napoleon III, and the latter's son Louis Napoléon, Prince Imperial.

Meanwhile, a sumptuous clubhouse was erected at 66-68 Pall Mall during 1874–5, being ready by the end of 1875. However, the lavish scale of the construction appears to have ruined the club's owner, with bankruptcy proceedings pending in June 1878. By the following year, the club had closed.

Subsequent occupants of the Pall Mall building seem to have been dogged by misfortune - the tenure of both the Beaconsfield Club (1880–1887) and the Unionist Club (1888–1892) were to be short-lived.

References

See also
 List of London's gentlemen's clubs

Gentlemen's clubs in London
1870s in London
1870 establishments in England
1879 disestablishments in England
Organizations established in 1870
Organizations disestablished in 1879
Military gentlemen's clubs